Luis Lezama was a Mexican screenwriter and film director.

Selected filmography

Director
 Tabaré. Traición y Gloria (1919)
 Los Hijos del Destino (1930)* Los Hijos del Destino (1930)
 Un Viejo Amor (1919)
 The Cemetery of the Eagles (1939)
 Tabaré. Sound version (1946)

References

Revista México Cinema, marzo de 1947. P. 19

Bibliography
 Alejandro Medrano Platas. Quince directores del cine mexicano: entrevistas. Plaza y Valdes, 1999.

External links

Year of birth unknown
Year of death unknown
Mexican film directors
Mexican film producers
Mexican screenwriters